= The Elevator Museum =

Coordinates: 42.7756°N 71.086°W

The Elevator Museum is a museum and non-profit 501(c)(3) organization in Rhode Island, United States.

== History ==
In 2011, The Elevator Historical Society was opened in Long Island City, New York by Patrick Carr a lifetime collector of elevator history with an exhibit of over 4000 elevator parts and components. Due to a lack of funding from the industry it elected to close in 2016 and transfer the collection to a group in Boston. The exhibit items were relocated to a temporary location at The International Union of Elevator Constructors Local 4 Union Hall in 2017, and combined with an extensive collection of artifacts by Stephen K. Comley and his father James F. Comley.

The Comleys funded a move to the Haverhill location, then assembled a board of advisors and directors, and in 2019 received non-profit status for The Elevator Museum.
